Lomatium dissectum is a species of flowering plant in the carrot family known by the common names fernleaf biscuitroot and fernleaf desert parsley. It is native to much of western North America, where it grows in varied habitat. It is found in the eastern slopes of the Cascade Range, Rocky Mountains, Klamath Mountains, eastern Transverse Ranges and the Sierra Nevada in California.

The inflorescence is an umbel of many small yellow or reddish flowers, each cluster on a leafless stem up to 10 cm long. The fruits resemble pumpkin seeds.

There are two varieties of Lomatium dissectum, both of which can be either yellow or purple in color when in bloom, but are distinguished by longer or shorter stalks on the fruit.

A Lomatium dissectum root extract completely inhibited the cytopathic effects of rotavirus. It also showed antibiotic activity against Mycobacterium tuberculosis and M. avium.

References

External links

Jepson Manual Treatment - Lomatium dissectum
USDA Plants Profile
Lomatium dissectum - Photo gallery

dissectum
Flora of Western Canada
Flora of the Western United States
Flora of the Sierra Nevada (United States)
Flora of California
Natural history of the Transverse Ranges
Taxa named by Lincoln Constance
Taxa named by Mildred Esther Mathias
Flora without expected TNC conservation status